Brent Bernard Sopel (born January 7, 1977) is a Canadian former professional ice hockey defenceman who played the majority of his career in the National Hockey League (NHL). Sopel was originally selected 144th overall at the 1995 NHL Entry Draft by the Vancouver Canucks. He has also played for the New York Islanders, Los Angeles Kings, Chicago Blackhawks, Atlanta Thrashers and Montreal Canadiens, winning the Stanley Cup in 2010 with Chicago.

In addition to his NHL career, Sopel has also played in the Kontinental Hockey League (KHL) with Metallurg Novokuznetsk and Salavat Yulaev Ufa, also briefly playing for the American Hockey League (AHL)'s Chicago Wolves before retiring from professional hockey in 2015.

Playing career

Vancouver Canucks
On April 3, 1996, just under a year after being drafted, Sopel signed his first professional contract with his draft team, the Vancouver Canucks. He was told by Coach Marc Crawford that he would never play in the NHL, but Sopel scored his first NHL goal on April 10, 1999, against the Edmonton Oilers' Tommy Salo. In 2002, Sopel won the Fred J. Hume Award for Unsung Hero voted by the Vancouver Canucks Booster Club. On December 31, 2001, and January 21, 2002, Sopel won USA Today's NHL Player of the Week award.

Sopel was traded back to the Canucks during their 2006–07 season on February 1, 2007, the NHL trade deadline day. He missed the first game of the 2007 Stanley Cup playoffs against the Dallas Stars after he injured his back while picking up a cracker that was dropped by his daughter. The Canucks beat the Stars in quadruple overtime, in the sixth longest game in NHL history.

New York Islanders
On August 3, 2005, the Canucks traded Sopel to the New York Islanders in exchange for a conditional draft pick in the 2006 NHL Entry Draft. On August 16, just under a week after being traded, Sopel signed a two-year, $4.8 million contract with the Islanders.

Chicago Blackhawks
Heading into the 2007–08 season with no contract, Sopel was invited to the Detroit Red Wings' training camp. However, on September 28, 2007, Sopel left Detroit's camp, instead signing a one-year, $1.5 million contract with the Chicago Blackhawks after the Red Wings had only offered a one-year, $500,000 contract. On January 10, 2008, Sopel signed a three-year, $7 million contract extension with the Blackhawks, keeping him in Chicago through to the 2010–11 season. On June 9, 2010, Brent Sopel won the Stanley Cup with the Chicago Blackhawks.

In June 2010, Sopel brought the team's recently-won Stanley Cup to the 2010 Chicago Gay Pride Parade. Sopel brought the Cup to the parade in honour of the late Brendan Burke, son of his former general manager while playing for Vancouver, Brian Burke, to display it in the Chicago Gay Pride Parade, stating to the press that honouring Burke's legacy and his father's example of familial support and tolerance was one of his reasons for marching in the parade.

Atlanta Thrashers
On June 23, 2010, Sopel was traded to the Atlanta Thrashers, along with Dustin Byfuglien, Ben Eager and Akim Aliu, in exchange for the 24th (Kevin Hayes) and 54th overall picks (Justin Holl) in the 2010 NHL Entry Draft, Marty Reasoner, Joey Crabb and Jeremy Morin.

Montreal Canadiens
After playing 59 games for Atlanta, registering two goals and seven points, Sopel was then traded to the Montreal Canadiens, along with Nigel Dawes, in exchange for Ben Maxwell and a fourth-round draft pick in 2011 on February 24, 2011.

Kontinental Hockey League
On July 29, 2011, Sopel announced that he had signed a two-year contract with Metallurg Novokuznetsk of the Kontinental Hockey League (KHL). During the 2012–13 season, his second with Novokuznetsk, Sopel was traded to Salavat Yulaev Ufa for their playoff campaign on January 31, 2013. During the subsequent summer, he signed a two-year contract extension with Salavat Yulaev.

Chicago Wolves
On October 10, 2014, the Chicago Wolves of the American Hockey League (AHL) announced that they had signed Sopel to a standard player contract for the 2014–15 season. On February 27, 2015, however, after 29 games played, Sopel announced his retirement from professional hockey.

Personal life
After his daughter was  diagnosed with dyslexia, Sopel was also diagnosed with the learning disability after the symptoms sounded similar to his struggles. This inspired him to 
create the Brent Sopel Foundation to help promote and raise funds for youth with dyslexia.

Career statistics

Awards
 2001 – Player of the Week (December 31, 2001 – January 6, 2002)
 2002 – NHL Player of the Week (January 21–27)
 2010 – Won Stanley Cup with the Chicago Blackhawks

References

External links
 

1977 births
Living people
Atlanta Thrashers players
Canadian expatriate ice hockey players in Russia
Canadian ice hockey defencemen
Chicago Blackhawks players
Chicago Wolves players
Ice hockey people from Saskatchewan
Kansas City Blades players
Los Angeles Kings players
Metallurg Novokuznetsk players
Montreal Canadiens players
New York Islanders players
Sportspeople with dyslexia
Salavat Yulaev Ufa players
Ice hockey people from Calgary
Sportspeople from Saskatoon
Saskatoon Blades players
Stanley Cup champions
Swift Current Broncos players
Syracuse Crunch players
Vancouver Canucks draft picks
Vancouver Canucks players